Karl Marks is a village in Jalal-Abad Region of Kyrgyzstan. It is part of the Toguz-Toro District. Its population was 724 in 2021.

References
 

Populated places in Jalal-Abad Region